Center Point Road is the fourth studio album by American country music singer Thomas Rhett, released on May 31, 2019, through Big Machine Label Group imprint Valory Music Co. It was supported by the lead single "Look What God Gave Her". Rhett co-wrote and co-produced all 16 tracks on the album, sharing production duties with Dann Huff, Jesse Frasure, Julian Bunetta, The Stereotypes, and Cleve Wilson. The album also features collaborations with Little Big Town, Jon Pardi, and Kelsea Ballerini. The album received a nomination for Best Country Album at the 62nd Annual Grammy Awards in 2020.

Background
Rhett named the album after a road from his hometown of Hendersonville, Tennessee that he said symbolized his childhood.

Promotion
"Look What God Gave Her" was released as the lead single from the album on March 1, 2019. On March 3, 2019, "Don't Threaten Me with a Good Time" was released, alongside a performance of it on Saturday Night Live. Rhett later revealed the cover art and track listing on March 29, and also shared the track "That Old Truck". On April 19, 2019, Rhett released "Remember You Young" as another promotional single.

Commercial performance
Center Point Road debuted at No. 1 on the US Billboard 200 with 76,000 album-equivalent units, of which 45,000 were pure album sales. It is Rhett's second No. 1 album. In its first week it registered 33.59 million US streams, making it the largest streaming week for a country album at the time. The album has sold more than 101,600 copies in pure albums in the US and 362,000 in units consumed.

Critical reception
Rhett was hailed for his versatility on Center Point Road by Rolling Stone, while Newsday suggested the album fell short of crossing over to pop music.

Track listing

Personnel
 Thomas Rhett – lead vocals, backing vocals
 Dave Cohen – keyboards
 Charlie Judge – keyboards, cello 
 Julian Bunetta – keyboards, programming, electric guitar, drums, backing vocals
 Matt Dragstrem – programming, backing vocals
 Jesse Frasure – programming, backing vocals
 David Huff – programming
 Zach Skelton – programming
 The Stereotypes – programming
 Cleve Wilson – programming
 Tyler Chiarelli – electric guitar
 Brandon Day – electric guitar
 Dann Huff – electric guitar
 John Ryan – electric guitar, backing vocals
 Derek Wells – electric guitar
 Ilya Toshinsky – acoustic guitars
 Jimmie Lee Sloas – bass
 Chris Kimmerer – drums
 Randy Leago – baritone saxophone
 Jim Hoke – tenor saxophone, horn arrangements
 Barry Green – trombone
 Mike Haynes – trumpet
 Kasey Akins – backing vocals
 Lauren Akins – backing vocals
 Bob Bailey – backing vocals
 Jamar Carter – backing vocals
 Everett Drake – backing vocals
 Kim Fleming – backing vocals
 Vicki Hampton – backing vocals
 Michael Hardy – backing vocals
 Ashley Gorley – backing vocals
 Kyla Jade – backing vocals
 Macy Page – backing vocals
 Josh Reedy – backing vocals
 Jason Kyle Saetveit – backing vocals
 Ryan Tedder – backing vocals
 Russell Terrell – backing vocals
 Amy Wadge – backing vocals
 Kelsea Ballerini – duet vocals on "Center Point Road"
 Little Big Town – backing vocals on "Don't Threaten Me with a Good Time"
 Jon Pardi – duet vocals on "Beer Can't Fix"

Charts

Weekly charts

Year-end charts

Certifications

References

2019 albums
Thomas Rhett albums
Big Machine Records albums
Albums produced by Dann Huff
Albums produced by Jesse Frasure